Nathalie Teirlinck (born 1985 in Brussels) is a Belgian film director and screenwriter.

In 2007, Teirlinck studied at the film department of the Royal Academy of Fine Arts in Ghent. Her three short films, Anémone (2006), Juliette (2007), and Venus vs. Me (2010), were all well received at international film festivals. Both Anémone and Juliette were awarded Best Short Film at the Flanders International Film Festival Ghent. Anémone was nominated at the Locarno Festival, and Venus vs. Me won the V.A.F. WildCard as well as the European Film Academy Award in the wake of the Berlin Film Festival in 2010.

After this, Teirlinck also directed music videos for Novastar, Lady Linn, Admiral Freebee, Amenra, and other artists. She made her theatrical directing debut with the 2009 production Send All Your Horses, and she went on to direct three more productions: Yesterday (2011), Staring Girl (2012), and Slumberland (2015). The last two were nominated for the Theaterfestival, and Slumberland won the Music Theater Now award in New York City in 2015. Since 2012, Teirlinck has also been a guest instructor at the film department of her alma mater, The Royal Academy of Fine Arts, in Ghent.

Teirlinck's first feature-length film, Le Passé devant nous (international title: Past Imperfect), was released in 2016, with Canadian actress Evelyne Brochu in the lead role. The film was produced by Savage Film—famous for producing such films as Bullhead—and was a co-production between Denmark and the Netherlands. The script won the Eurimages Award at CineMart during the International Film Festival Rotterdam in 2015, and, in September 2017, won two Ensor Awards: the Industry Award and Best Debut. In 2018 Nathalie Teirlinck was awarded the Culture Prize from the City of Ghent.

Personal life 
Teirlinck is originally from Brussels, but has been living in Ghent since 2006. In addition to her native Dutch, she also speaks French and English.

Filmography 
 2016: Le Passé devant nous
 2010: Venus vs. Me (short film)
 2007: Juliette (short film)
 2006: Anémone (short film)

Selected awards and nominations

References

External links 
 

1985 births
Belgian film directors
Belgian women film directors
Belgian screenwriters
Mass media people from Brussels
Living people
Belgian women screenwriters